The Lord Mayor of London is the mayor of the City of London and the leader of the City of London Corporation. Within the City, the Lord Mayor is accorded precedence over all individuals except the sovereign and retains various traditional powers, rights, and privileges, including the title and style The Right Honourable Lord Mayor of London.

One of the world's oldest continuously elected civic offices, it is entirely separate from the directly elected Mayor of London, a political office controlling a budget which covers the much larger area of Greater London.

The Corporation of London changed its name to the City of London Corporation in 2006, and accordingly the title Lord Mayor of the City of London was introduced, so as to avoid confusion with that of Mayor of London. However, the legal and commonly used title remains Lord Mayor of London. The Lord Mayor is elected at Common Hall each year on Michaelmas, and takes office on the Friday before the second Saturday in November, at The Silent Ceremony. The Lord Mayor's Show is held on the day after taking office; the Lord Mayor, preceded by a procession, travels to the Royal Courts of Justice at the Strand to swear allegiance to the sovereign before the Justices of the High Court.

The Lord Mayor's main role nowadays is to represent, support and promote the businesses and residents in the City of London. Today these businesses are mostly in the financial sector, and the Lord Mayor is regarded as the champion of the entire UK-based financial sector regardless of ownership or location throughout the country. As leader of the Corporation of the City of London, the Lord Mayor serves as the key spokesman for the local authority and also has important ceremonial and social responsibilities. The Lord Mayor is non-affiliated politically, typically delivering many hundreds of speeches and addresses per year and attending many receptions and other events in London and beyond. Incumbents usually make overseas visits under the auspices of the FCDO. The Lord Mayor, ex officio Rector of City, University of London and also Admiral of the Port of London, is assisted in day-to-day administration by the Mansion House 'Esquires' whose titles include the City Marshal, Sword Bearer and Common Crier.

Nicholas Lyons serves as the 694th Lord Mayor (for 2022–2023). The Lord Mayor is assisted as aide-de-camp by Lieutenant Tony Blaney RMR, Sea Cadet Corps, and as Lord Mayor's Chaplain by the Revd Monsignor James Curry.

Titles and honours

Of the 69 cities in the United Kingdom, the City of London is among the 30 that have lord mayors (or, in Scotland, lords provost). The Lord Mayor is entitled to the prefix The Right Honourable; the same privilege extends only to the lord mayors of York, Cardiff, Bristol and Belfast, and to the lords provost of Edinburgh and Glasgow. The style, however, is used when referring to the office as opposed to the holder thereof; thus, "The Rt Hon Lord Mayor of London" would be correct, while "The Rt Hon William Russell" would be incorrect. The latter prefix applies only to privy counsellors and peers.

A woman who holds the office is also known as a Lord Mayor. The wife of a male Lord Mayor is styled as Lady Mayoress, but no equivalent title exists for the husband of a female Lord Mayor. A female lord mayor or an unmarried male lord mayor may appoint a female consort, usually a fellow member of the corporation, to the role of lady mayoress. In speech, a lord mayor is referred to as "My Lord Mayor", and a lady mayoress as "My Lady Mayoress".

It was once customary for lord mayors to be appointed knights upon taking office and baronets upon retirement, unless they already held such a title. This custom was followed with a few inconsistencies from the 16th until the 19th centuries; creations became more regular from 1889 onwards. However, from 1964 onwards, the regular creation of hereditary titles such as baronetcies was phased out, so subsequent lord mayors were offered knighthoods (and, until 1993, most often as Knight Grand Cross of the Order of the British Empire (GBE)). Since 1993, lord mayors have not automatically received any national honour upon appointment; instead, they have been made knights bachelor upon retirement, although Gordon Brown's Government broke with that tradition by making Ian Luder a CBE, after his term of office in 2009, and the following year Nick Anstee declined offers of an honour. Furthermore, foreign heads of state visiting the City of London on a UK state visit, diplomatically bestow upon the Lord Mayor one of their suitable national honours. For example, in 2001, Sir David Howard was created a grand cordon (first class) of the Order of Independence of Jordan by King Abdullah II. Recently lord mayors have been appointed at the beginning of their term of office knights or dames of St John, as a mark of respect, by Queen Elizabeth II, Sovereign Head of the Order of St John.

History

The office of mayor was instituted in 1189, the first holder of the office being Henry Fitz-Ailwin de Londonestone. The mayor of the City of London has been elected by the City, rather than appointed by the sovereign, ever since a Royal Charter providing for a Mayor was issued by King John in 1215. The title "lord mayor" came to be used after 1354, when it was granted to Thomas Legge (then serving his second of two terms) by King Edward III.

Lord mayors are elected for one-year terms; by custom, they do not now serve more than one consecutive term. Numerous individuals have served multiple terms in office, including:

As Mayor
 24 terms: Sir Henry FitzAlan (1189–1212)
 9 terms: Ralph de Sandwich (1285–1289, 1289–1292)
 8 terms: Gregory de Rokesley (1274–1280, 1284)
 7 terms: Andrew Buckerel (1231–1237); John le Breton (1289, 1293–1298); John le Blund (1301–1307)
 6 terms: Richard le Ranger (1222–1226, 1238); Hamo de Chigwell (1319, 1321, 1322, 1324, 1325, 1327)
 5 terms: Serlo le Mercer (1214, 1218–1221)
As Lord Mayor
 Sir Nicholas Brembre (1377, 1383–1385; 4 terms)
 Sir Richard ('Dick') Whittington (1397, 1398, 1406 and 1419; 4 terms)
William Sevenoke (1418)
 Sir Robert Fowler (elected in 1883 and in 1885).
 Sir William Russell (2019–2021, 2 terms)

Almost 700 people have served as lord mayor. Dame Mary Donaldson , elected in 1983, as well as Dame Fiona Woolf , elected in 2013, are the only women to have held the office.

Some lord mayors in the Middle Ages, such as Sir Edward Dalyngrigge (1392), did not reside in London. Since 1435, the lord mayor has been chosen from amongst the aldermen of the City of London.

Election
The lord mayor is elected at Common Hall, comprising liverymen belonging to all of the City's livery companies. Common Hall is summoned by the sitting lord mayor; it meets at Guildhall on Michaelmas Day (29 September) or on the closest weekday. Voting is by show of hands; if, however, any liveryman so demands, balloting is held a fortnight later.

The qualification to stand for election is that one must have served as a City sheriff and be a current alderman. Since 1385, prior service as sheriff has been mandatory for election to the lord mayoralty. Two sheriffs are selected annually by Common Hall, which meets on Midsummer's Day for this purpose. By an ordinance of 1435, the lord mayor must be chosen from amongst the aldermen of the City of London. Those on the electoral roll of each of the City's 25 wards select one alderman, who formerly held office for life or until resignation. Now each alderman must submit for re-election at least once in every six years.

The lord mayor is then sworn in November, on the day before the Lord Mayor's Show (see below). The ceremony is known as the "Silent Ceremony" because, aside from a short declaration by the incoming Lord Mayor, no speeches are made. At Guildhall, the outgoing lord mayor transfers the mayoral insignia – the seal, the purse, the sword and the mace — to the incoming lord mayor.

The lord mayor to be elected in November 2017 was known in April of that year.

Lord Mayor's Show

The day after being sworn into office, the lord mayor leads a procession from the City of London to the Royal Courts of Justice in the City of Westminster, where the lord mayor swears allegiance to the Crown. This pageantry has evolved into one of London's longest-running and most popular annual events, known as the "Lord Mayor's Show". The lord mayor travels in the City's state coach that was built in 1757 at a cost of £1,065.0s.3d. Nowadays, this festival combines traditional British pageantry with the element of carnival, and since 1959 it has been held on the second Saturday in November. Participants include the livery companies, bands and members of the military, charities and schools. In the evening, a fireworks display is held.

Role

The lord mayor is a member of the City of London's governing body, the City of London Corporation (incorporated as The Mayor and Commonalty and Citizens of the City of London). The Corporation comprises the Court of Aldermen and the Court of Common Council; the former includes only the aldermen, while the latter includes both aldermen and common councilmen. The Lord mayor belongs to and presides over both bodies.

As noted earlier, the main role of the lord mayor is to represent, support and promote all aspects of UK-financial service industries, including maritime. They undertake this as head of the City of London Corporation and, during the year, host visiting foreign government ministers, businessmen and dignitaries; furthermore, they conduct several foreign visits of their own so as to promote British financial sectors.

Banquets hosted by the Lord Mayor serve as opportunities for senior government figures to deliver major speeches. At the Lord Mayor's Banquet (held on the Monday after the Lord Mayor's Show), the Prime Minister delivers the keynote address. At the Banker's Dinner in June, the Chancellor of the Exchequer delivers a speech known as the "Mansion House Speech", which takes its name from the Lord Mayor's residence. At the Easter Banquet, also hosted each year at the Mansion House, the Foreign Secretary addresses an audience of international dignitaries.

The lord mayor sometimes takes part in major state occasions, for example in 2013, the then-lord mayor, Sir Roger Gifford carried the Mourning Sword at Margaret Thatcher's funeral, processing ahead of the Queen and Prince Philip, Duke of Edinburgh, into St Paul's Cathedral.

The lord mayor performs numerous other functions, including serving as the chief magistrate of the City of London, admiral of the Port of London, rector of City, University of London, president of Gresham College, president of City of London Reserve Forces and Cadets Association, and trustee of St Paul's Cathedral. The lord mayor also heads the City's Commission of Lieutenancy, which represents the sovereign in the City of London (other counties usually have lord lieutenants, as opposed to Commissions), and annually attends the Treloar Trust (named after Sir William Treloar, lord mayor in 1906), in Hampshire.  The Treloar Trust runs two educational sites for disabled children, a school and college.

Rights and privileges

The residence of the lord mayor is known as Mansion House. The establishment of the residence was considered after the Great Fire of London (1666), but construction did not commence until 1739. It was first occupied by a lord mayor in 1752, when Sir Crispin Gascoigne took up residence. The official car of the lord mayor is a Rolls-Royce Phantom VI with registration number LM0.

In each of the eighteen courtrooms of the Old Bailey, the centre of the judges' bench is reserved for the lord mayor, in his capacity of chief justice of the City of London. The presiding judge therefore sits to one side.

It is sometimes asserted that the lord mayor may exclude the monarch from the City of London. The legend is based on the misinterpretation of the ceremony observed each time the sovereign enters the City: at Temple Bar the lord mayor presents the City's Pearl Sword to the sovereign as a symbol of the latter's overlordship. The monarch does not, as is often purported, wait for the lord mayor's permission to enter the City. When the sovereign enters the City, a short ceremony usually takes place where the lord mayor presents a sword to the monarch, symbolically surrendering their authority. If the sovereign is attending a service at St Paul's this ceremony would take place there rather than at the boundary of the City for matters of convenience.

The importance of the office is reflected by the composition of the Accession Council, a body which proclaims the accession of new sovereigns. The Council includes the lord mayor and aldermen of London, as well as members of the House of Lords and privy counsellors. At the coronation banquet which followed, the lord mayor of the City of London had the right to assist the royal butler. The same privilege is held by the lord mayor of Oxford; the mayor of Winchester may assist the royal cook. Such privileges have not been exercised since 1821, when the last coronation banquet (celebrating the coronation of George IV) was held.

Official dress
On formal occasions the lord mayor wears traditional black velvet court dress (old style) consisting of a coat, waistcoat and knee breeches with steel cut buttons. This is worn with black silk stockings, patent court shoes with steel buckles, white shirt with lace cuffs and a large jabot stock. This form of court dress is worn by all lord mayors regardless of gender.

When outdoors, they wear a black beaver plush tricorne hat trimmed with black ostrich feathers and a steel 'loop' for the cockade. This has been traditionally made by Patey's commissioned by the Worshipful Company of Feltmakers for each incumbent lord mayor.

Since 1545 the lord mayor of London has worn a Royal Livery Collar of Esses. However, the collar's origins are not royal, Sir John Alleyn, twice lord mayor, having bequeathed it to the next lord mayor and his successors "to use and occupie yerely at and uppon principall and festivall dayes." It was enlarged in 1567, and in its present shape has 28 Esses (the Lancastrian ‘S’), Tudor roses and the tasselled knots of the Garter (alternating) and also the Portcullis, from which hangs the Mayoral Jewel. The collar is worn over whatever the lord mayor may be wearing, secured onto their underdress or State Robes by means of black or white silk satin ribbons on the shoulders.

Robes

As an alderman of the City of London the lord mayor has a scarlet gown and a violet gown, which are identical to those worn by their fellow aldermen except that they are trained. The violet robe is worn at most formal meetings of the Corporation with the scarlet robe substituted on certain days or occasions as directed by the City Ceremonial Book.

For State occasions when the monarch is present, the lord mayor wears a crimson velvet robe of state trimmed with an ermine cape and facings, very similar to a royal earl's coronation robe. It is tied with gold cordons, and dates from the reign of George IV.

On other ceremonial occasions is worn a black silk damask robe trimmed with gold lace of a design exactly the same as that of the lord Chancellor, known as the Entertaining Gown.

At coronations, the lord mayor wears a special coronation robe: a mantle of scarlet superfine wool trimmed with bars of gold lace and ermine. It is lined with white silk satin; they also carry the Crystal Sceptre as a baton of office. After the coronation, the incumbent may personally keep their coronation robe as a token.

There is also a plain black gown, worn by the lord mayor in times of national mourning and/or grief.

List of Lord Mayors of London

See also
Mayor of London
Town Clerk of London
Chamberlain of London
City status in the United Kingdom
List of lord mayoralties and lord provostships in the United Kingdom
Lord Mayor of Dublin

References
City of London Corporation home page
Jenkins, S. (2004). "Royal Coronations and Oxford Mayors."
"London (England)." (1911). Encyclopædia Britannica, 11th ed. London: Cambridge University Press.
"Lord Mayor's Show." (2002).
"The Lord Mayor's Show Saturday 13th November 2004." (2004).
"Temple Bar." (1911). Encyclopædia Britannica, 11th ed. London: Cambridge University Press.

Notes

External links

BBC – Lord Mayor's Show

Local government in London

1189 establishments in England
City of London
Politics of the United Kingdom
People associated with City, University of London
People associated with the Royal National College for the Blind
Ceremonial officers in the United Kingdom